Quercus deliquescens is a species of oak tree in the family Fagaceae, native to northeast Mexico. It is placed in section Quercus.

Distribution
The tree is endemic to Chihuahua state of Mexico.

It is known only from one population system in the valley of Río Conchos and north along the Río Grande.  It grows in dry montane scrub habitats, and the dense scrublands that cover northern Mexico.

It is an IUCN Red List Vulnerable species, threatened by habitat loss.

See also

References

Sources
Current IUCN Red List of all Threatened Species

deliquescens
Flora of Northeastern Mexico
Endemic oaks of Mexico
Flora of Chihuahua (state)
Rio Conchos
Taxonomy articles created by Polbot
Flora of the Chihuahuan Desert
Flora of the Mexican Plateau